Trails or Paths is a 1978 Portuguese art film directed by João César Monteiro in his debut feature.

Synopsis 
"History of the Branca-Flor" from legends and figures of popular mythology. Roots of an itinerary through the natural and landscape origins, to the heart of Portugal. The values (water, birth, life-wheel), the figures (the devil, the wolves) and the references (the lord, servitude), with a stigma of unavoidable justice".

Cast
 Manuela de Freitas
 Luís de Sousa Costa
 Francisco Domingues
 Carmen Duarte
 Margarida Gil
 António Mendes

References

External links

1978 films
Films directed by João César Monteiro